Sun Xiaoqian (born 11 August 1996) is a Chinese judoka. In 2021, she competed in the women's 70 kg event at the 2020 Summer Olympics in Tokyo, Japan.

She is the bronze medallist of the 2021 Asian-Pacific Judo Championships in the -70 kg category.

References

External links
 

1996 births
Living people
Chinese female judoka
Judoka at the 2020 Summer Olympics
Olympic judoka of China
20th-century Chinese women
21st-century Chinese women